Kersploosh!, known in Europe as Splash or Crash and in Japan as , is a puzzle video game developed by Poisoft for the Nintendo 3DS. The game was released on the Nintendo eShop in Japan on June 7, 2011, in Europe on February 28, 2013 and in North America on March 7, 2013.

Gameplay
Kersploosh! is a unique game based on the premise of what an object might see when it is thrown down a well. The goal of the game is to steer the chosen object to the bottom of the well in as fast a time as possible without it breaking. Players can unlock various objects to throw down the well, including stones, iron balls, jewels, watermelons, plates and matryoshka dolls, each with varying speed and durability. On the way down, players use the Circle Pad to steer their object in order to avoid obstacles such as wooden planks, shutters, cannons and homing cookies. Passing through giant doughnuts gives the object a burst of speed, while popping balloons can recover health. There are ten wells with their own high score tables, with players able to exchange high scores via StreetPass.

Reception
Nintendo Life gave the game a score of 8/10, praising it for its addictiveness.

Sequel
A sequel, 新ひゅ～ストン (Shin Hyu~suton; New Hyu-stone), was released in Japan in 2015. It featured double the number of stones to drop and four times the amount of well to traverse.

References

External links
Official website 

2011 video games
Nintendo 3DS-only games
Nintendo 3DS eShop games
Puzzle video games
Nintendo 3DS games
Video games developed in Japan